Nik Prelec (born 10 June 2001) is a Slovenian professional footballer who plays as a forward for Italian  club Cagliari.

Career
Prelec started his career with Italian Serie A side Sampdoria. Before the second half of 2021–22, he was sent on loan to Olimpija in Slovenia. In 2022, Prelec signed for Austrian club WSG Tirol.

On 31 January 2023, Prelec signed a three-and-a-half-year contract with Cagliari in Italy.

References

External links
 

Living people
2001 births
Sportspeople from Maribor
Slovenian footballers
Association football forwards
Slovenia youth international footballers
Slovenian PrvaLiga players
Austrian Football Bundesliga players
NK Olimpija Ljubljana (2005) players
U.C. Sampdoria players
WSG Tirol players
Cagliari Calcio players
Slovenian expatriate footballers
Slovenian expatriate sportspeople in Austria
Expatriate footballers in Austria
Slovenian expatriate sportspeople in Italy
Expatriate footballers in Italy